The Jungbu Naeryuk Expressway (literally meaning Central Inland Expwy.) is an expressway in South Korea. Numbered 45, it was first constructed in three parts: connecting Yeoju to Chungju and Sangju to Gimcheon and Hyeonpung to Masan. The part of the expressway between Chungju and Sangju was completed at the end of 2004, with the last remaining section being that between Gimcheon and Hyeonpung. The Jungbu Naeryuk Expressway Branch Line (a.k.a. Guma Expressway) is route number 451 and connects Hyeonpung to N. Daegu.

A speed zone exists from Exit 1 to Exit 13 (Masan-Gimcheon). The maximum speed is 100 km/h, and the minimum speed is 50 km/h. Another speed zone exists from north of exit 13 to exit 28 (Gimcheon-N. Yeoju). The maximum speed limit is 110 km/h, and the minimum speed limit is 50 km/h.

History
December, 1977 - Daegu~Masan Section open the traffic(Guma Exressway)
September 28, 2001 - Sangju~Gimcheon Section open the traffic.
December 20, 2002 - Yeoju~Chungju Section open the traffic.
December 15, 2004 - Sangju~Chungju Section open the traffic.
November 30, 2007 - Gimcheon~Hyeonpung JC Section open the traffic.
September 15, 2010 - Yeoju~N.Yeoju Section open the traffic.
December 28, 2012 - N.Yeoju~Yangpyeong Section open the traffic.

Information

Lanes 
 4 Lanes

Lengths 
 301.77 km

Speed limit 
 Naeseo JC ~ Gimcheon JC / N.Yeoju IC~Yangpyeong IC : 100 km/h
 Gimcheon JC ~ N.Yeoju IC : 110 km/h

Branch Line 
 See Jungbu Naeryuk Expressway Branch

List of facilities 

 IC: Interchange, JC: Junction, SA: Service Area, TG:Tollgate

See also
Roads and expressways in South Korea
Transportation in South Korea

External links
 MOLIT South Korean Government Transport Department

Expressways in South Korea
Roads in South Gyeongsang
Roads in Daegu
Roads in North Gyeongsang
Roads in North Chungcheong
Roads in Gyeonggi